Addison is a village located in the Chicago Metropolitan Area, in DuPage County, Illinois, United States. The population was 36,942 at the 2010 census.

History
The community itself was originally named Dunkley's Grove after the settler Hezekiah Dunklee, and was renamed after a town in England or Addison, New York. In 1832, Winfield Scott built Army Trail Road on top of a Potawatomi trail in Addison, in order to allow 50 broad-tired wagons to fight Black Hawk and his warriors. In 1864, the Lutheran Church–Missouri Synod moved its teacher training to the village from Fort Wayne, Indiana, and established the Addison Teachers Seminary; it remained in Addison until 1913, when it was relocated to River Forest, Illinois, as Concordia Teachers College (now Concordia University Chicago).

The village was incorporated in 1884, at which time it had a population of 400.

Adventureland amusement park was located in Addison (Lake and Medinah) during the 1960s and 1970s. The Addison Industrial District was the proposed location for the reconstruction of Comiskey Park in the late 1980s before this was voted down.

Geography
The Village of Addison lies on Salt Creek, a tributary of the Des Plaines River.

Demographics

As of the 2020 census there were 35,702 people, 12,799 households, and 9,165 families residing in the village. The racial makeup of the village was 47.69% White, 3.45% African American, 1.71% Native American, 8.10% Asian, 0.04% Pacific Islander, 22.96% from other races, and 16.05% from two or more races. Hispanic or Latino of any race were 45.61% of the population.

There were 12,799 households, out of which 57.46% had children under the age of 18 living with them, 54.47% were married couples living together, 12.74% had a female householder with no husband present, and 28.39% were non-families. 23.23% of all households were made up of individuals, and 8.84% had someone living alone who was 65 years of age or older. The average household size was 3.40 and the average family size was 2.86.

The village's age distribution consisted of 22.7% under the age of 18, 9.3% from 18 to 24, 26.6% from 25 to 44, 25.8% from 45 to 64, and 15.6% who were 65 years of age or older. The median age was 37.8 years. For every 100 females, there were 97.2 males. For every 100 females age 18 and over, there were 94.8 males.

The median income for a household in the village was $68,534, and the median income for a family was $79,011. Males had a median income of $42,038 versus $30,828 for females. The per capita income for the village was $30,202. About 10.3% of families and 13.5% of the population were below the poverty line, including 26.3% of those under age 18 and 8.4% of those age 65 or over.

Economy

Top employers
According to Addison's 2022 Comprehensive Annual Financial Report, the top employers in the city were:

Arts and culture
 Addison Public Library.
 Addison Perspective 
 Addison Center for the Arts

Government
Rich Veenstra is the Mayor of Addison. Other elected officials include Village Trustees Sam Nasti, Tom Hundley, Bill Lynch, Cathy Kluczny, Dawn O'Brien, Jay DelRosario, and Village Clerk Lucille Zucchero. The town of Triggiano, Italy is the sister city of Addison.

Addison is located in Illinois's 8th congressional district which is currently represented by Raja Krishnamoorthi (D-Schaumburg).
In the Illinois Senate it is Represented by Don Harmon (D-Oak Park) and Seth Lewis (R-Bartlett). In the Illinois House of Representatives it is represented by Jennifer Sanalitro (R-Hanover Park), Diane Blair-Sherlock (D-Villa Park). and Norma Hernandez (D-Melrose Park).

Education
Addison is home to Addison Trail High School  and to Indian Trail Junior High School. The Elementary schools are: Ardmore, Wesley Elementary, Lake Park Elementary, Fullerton Elementary, Army Trail Elementary, Lincoln Elementary and Stone Elementary. St. Philip the Apostle, a private Catholic school and parish, is located in Addison and serves students from pre-kindergarten through 8th grade. Driscoll Catholic High School was located in Addison before closing in 2009. DeVry University and Chamberlain College of Nursing also call Addison home.  Addison also has an Early Learning Center for 3-5-year-old students in Pre-K.

Notable people

 Adam Amin, sportscaster with ESPN and NBC Sports Chicago, raised in Addison and a graduate of Addison Trail High School
 Mark Anelli, former tight end for the San Francisco 49ers and St. Louis Rams
 Tim Breslin, professional hockey player who played left wing for the Chicago Wolves
 Jim Ellison, founder of the legendary Power Pop band, Material Issue, along with Ted Ansani and Mike Zelenko
 Jamie Freveletti, author of the Covert-One series novels The Janus Reprisal and The Geneva Strategy
 Bobby Hull, Hockey Hall of Fame inductee who lived in Addison from 1963 to 1971 while playing left wing for the Chicago Black Hawks
 Brett Hull, hall of fame professional hockey player and son of Bobby Hull who grew up in Addison from 1964 to 1971
 George Ireland, men's basketball coach who led the Loyola Ramblers to win the 1963 NCAA championship. He died in Addison
 Kyle Kinane, stand-up comedian and actor (Those Who Can't, Love, @midnight), raised in Addison and a graduate of Addison Trail High School
 Hubert J. Loftus, lawyer and politician
 Tony Pasquesi, defensive lineman for the Chicago Cardinals from 1955 to 1957, a resident of Addison at the time of his death
 Rob Renzetti, animator and creator of My Life as a Teenage Robot, raised in Addison
 Mike Retondo, bassist for the Plain White T's 
 Mark Rodenhauser, an American football player who played center for seven NFL teams from 1987 to 1999, played football at Addison Trail High School
 Alexa Scimeca Knierim, pair skater, 5-time U.S. national champion, two-time Olympian and winner of the 2022 World Figure Skating Championships with partner Brandon Frazier, 2015 U.S. Figure Skating Championships with her then-fiancé Chris Knierim, raised in Addison and a graduate of Addison Trail High School
 Rocco Sisto, actor best known for playing young Junior Soprano on The Sopranos
Gabriel (Gaga) Slonina, goalkeeper for Chicago Fire FC in the MLS who became the youngest starting goalkeeper in MLS history at the age of 17 years and 81 days
 Leon Spinks, World Boxing Council and World Boxing Association heavyweight world champion who resided in Addison after his retirement from boxing
 Lina Trivedi, involved with creation of (Beanie Babies), resident of Addison for most of her school-age and young-adult life and a graduate of Addison Trail High School
 Lenae Williams, basketball player who played guard-forward for the Detroit Shock during the 2002 WNBA season
 Kathleen Willis, member of the Illinois House of Representatives whose district includes the eastern half of the city, of which she is a resident

References

Further reading

External links

Village of Addison

 
Villages in Illinois
Chicago metropolitan area
Villages in DuPage County, Illinois
Populated places established in 1839
1839 establishments in Illinois